Prathama or Pratipada is the Sanskrit word for "first", and is the first day in the lunar fortnight (Paksha) of the Hindu calendar. Each month has two Prathama days, being the first day of the "bright" (Shukla) and of the "dark" (Krishna) fortnights respectively. Prathama occurs on the first and the sixteenth day of each month.

Occasions
 Gudhi Padva, the Marathi name for Chaitra Shukla Pratipada. It is celebrated on the first day of the Chaitra month to mark the beginning of the New Year according to the lunisolar Hindu calendar. This day is also the first day of Chaitra Navaratri and Ghatasthapana also known as Kalash Sthapana is done on this day.
 Govardhan Puja, a North Indian festival, occurs on Prathama in the month of Kartika.
 Bali Pratipada, a South Indian and Maharashtrian festival, also occurs on Prathama in the month of Kartika.
 Ugadi, the Telugu name for Chaitra Shuddha Padyami. It is celebrated on the first day of the Chaitra month to mark the beginning of the New year according to the lunisolar Hindu Shalivahan Shaka calendar.

References 

Hindu calendar
01